Sterkwater (also known as Ga-Pila) is a town in Mogalakwena Local Municipality in the Limpopo province of South Africa.

References

Populated places in the Mogalakwena Local Municipality